Alvarado's salamander (Bolitoglossa alvaradoi), also known as the Moravia de Chirripo salamander, is a species of salamander in the family Plethodontidae.

It is endemic to Costa Rica.
Its natural habitat is lowland moist and wet forests and premontane rainforests. This species is extremely rarely seen so its population status in unknown, but its habitat is threatened by habitat loss and it is classified as "vulnerable".

References

Bolitoglossa
Amphibians of Costa Rica
Endemic fauna of Costa Rica
Amphibians described in 1954
Endangered fauna of North America
Taxonomy articles created by Polbot